Lucas Newton "Chief" Turk (May 2, 1898 – January 11, 1994) was a pitcher in Major League Baseball. He played for the Washington Senators in 1922.

References

External links

1898 births
1994 deaths
Major League Baseball pitchers
Washington Senators (1901–1960) players
Columbia Comers players
Oglethorpe Stormy Petrels baseball players
Piedmont Lions baseball players
Baseball players from Georgia (U.S. state)